The women's road race competition at the 2002 Asian Games was held on 2 October at the Road Cycle Race Stadium. The race was 96.8 km long and began with a mass start.

Schedule
All times are Korea Standard Time (UTC+09:00)

Results

References

External links 
Results

Road Women